Petr Narovec (born 15 April 1977, in Prague) is a Slovak bobsledder who has competed since 2009. At the 2010 Winter Olympics, he finished 20th in the two-man event while crashing out in the four-man event.

Narovec's best World Cup finish was 20th in the four-man event at Lake Placid, New York in November 2009.

References
 Profile at Sports-Reference.com
 

1977 births
Bobsledders at the 2010 Winter Olympics
Bobsledders at the 2014 Winter Olympics
Living people
Olympic bobsledders of Slovakia
Slovak male bobsledders
Sportspeople from Prague